The men's light flyweight event was part of the boxing programme at the 1972 Summer Olympics.  The weight class was the lightest contested, and allowed boxers of up to 48 kilograms to compete. The competition was held from 28 August to 10 September 1972. 31 boxers from 31 nations competed.

Medalists

Results
The following boxers took part in the event:

First round
 Chanyalev Haile (ETH) def. Timothy Feruka (ZAM), KO-1
 Héctor Velasquez (CHL) def. Vandui Batbayar (MGL), 5:0
 Ralph Evans (GBR) def. Salvador García (MEX), 4:1
 Asen Nikolov (BUL) def. Yoshimitsu Aragaki (JPN), 5:0
 Vladimir Ivanov (URS) def. Carlos Leyes (ARG), 5:0
 György Gedó (HUN) def. Sripirom Surapong (THA), TKO-3
 Dennis Talbot (AUS) def. Francisco Rodriguez (VEN), KO-2
 Said Ahmed El-Ashry (EGY) def. Meriga Salou Seriki (DAH), 5:0
 James Odwori (UGA) def. Vicente Arsenal (PHI), TKO-2
 Kim U-Gil (PRK) def. Bakari Selemani (TNZ), TKO-1
 Lee Suk-Un (KOR) def. Roman Rozek (POL), 5:0
 Davey Armstrong (USA) def. Arif Dorgu (TUR), 4:1
 Enrique Rodriguez (ESP) def. Alexandru Turei (ROU), 3:2
 Rafael Carbonell (CUB) def. Prudencio Cardona (COL), 5:0
 Kadir Syed Abdul (SIN) def. Gaetano Curcetti (ITA), TKO-3

Second round
 Chanyalev Haile (ETH) def. Shekie Kongo (MAW), TKO-2
 Ralph Evans (GBR) def. Héctor Velasquez (CHL), 5:0
 Vladimir Ivanov (URS) def. Asen Nikolov (BUL), 5:0
 György Gedó (HUN) def. Dennis Talbot (AUS), 5:0
 James Odwori (UGA) def. Said Ahmed El-Ashry (EGY), TKO-2
 Kim U-Gil (PRK) def. Lee Suk-Un (KOR), 4:1
 Enrique Rodríguez (ESP) def. Davey Armstrong (USA), 5:0
 Rafael Carbonell (CUB) def. Kadir Syed Abdul (SIN), TKO-2

Quarterfinals
 Ralph Evans (GBR) def. Chanyalev Haile (ETH), 5:0
 György Gedó (HUN) def. Vladimir Ivanov (URS), 3:2
 Kim U-Gil (PRK) def. James Odwori (UGA), KO-2
 Enrique Rodríguez (ESP) def. Rafael Carbonell (CUB), 4:1

Semifinals
 György Gedó (HUN) def. Ralph Evans (GBR), 5:0
 Kim U-Gil (PRK) def. Enrique Rodríguez (ESP), 3:2

Final
 György Gedó (HUN) def. Kim U-Gil (PRK), 5:0

References

Light Flyweight